(also known as Robinson: Paradise vs Robinson) was the tenth season of the , the Danish version of the Swedish show Expedition Robinson. This season premiered on September 17, 2007 and aired until December 3, 2007. The main twist this season was that every contestant was either an alumnus of previous seasons or of the reality show Paradise Hotel. There weren't any other major twists this season until episode 5 when both Mars Johansen and Michelle Strøyer were voted out together in the sixth tribal council. Following the vote, the two faced off in a duel in order to determine who would return to the game. Mars won the duel and returned to the game. In episode 6, the Robinson team lost the immunity challenge and faced a double elimination at tribal council. Ivan Larsen and Malene Hasselblad were voted out of the tribe. The next twist occurred in episode 7, just before the merge, when each tribe had to vote out two members. In another twist, in episode 9, Malene Hasselblad, who had been voted out in episode 6, returned to the game. Ultimately, it was Rikke Gøransson from Paradise Hotel 2007 who won the season over former Robinson winner Malene Hasselblad and Paradise Hotel 2007 alumni Kenneth Eber by winning the final challenge.

Finishing order

External links
http://www.worldofbigbrother.com

Robinson Ekspeditionen seasons
Danish reality television series
2007 Danish television seasons